"I Loved Her First" is the debut song recorded by American country music band Heartland. It was released in June 2006 as the first single title track from their debut studio album I Loved Her First (2006). The song reached Number One on the U.S. Billboard Hot Country Songs charts in late 2006, the band's only number-one hit on that chart.  The song was written by Walt Aldridge and Elliott Park.

Content
The song is a mid-tempo ballad in triple meter. In it, the male narrator is talking to the man who is about to marry his daughter, telling him that he is having difficulty giving her away because he "loved her first." The song is a signature Father-Daughter song to dance to at wedding receptions for numerous brides and their fathers.

Critical reception
Deborah Evans Price, of Billboard magazine reviewed the song favorably, calling it a "beautifully written tearjerker that will hit home with dads everywhere who can't believe their little girls have grown up so soon." She calls Albert's performance "wonderful" and says that it "wrings every drop of emotion from the tender lyric."

Music video
The music video was directed by Todd Schaffer and premiered in mid-2006. It features the group singing and a family at a wedding reception.

Chart performance
"I Loved Her First" debuted at number 57 on the U.S. Billboard Hot Country Singles & Tracks for the week of July 8, 2006. Driven by a viral video of a father singing the ballad in sign language at his daughter's wedding, it reappeared on the chart almost nine years later at number 7 on the chart dated February 21, 2015. The song has sold over one million copies.

Charts

Weekly charts

Year-end charts

References

2006 songs
2006 debut singles
Songs written by Walt Aldridge
Heartland (band) songs
Lofton Creek Records singles